Paulo Roberto Costa Regula (born 12 March 1989) is a Portuguese professional footballer who plays as a midfielder.

Club career
Regula was born in Sarilhos Pequenos, Setúbal District. After starting to play football with Sporting CP, he moved to Vitória F.C. in 2002 at the age of 13, where he completed his development. In the 2008–09 season he began to receive callups to the main squad, making his debut in the Primeira Liga on 24 January 2009 by coming on as a 62nd-minute substitute in a 0–1 home loss against Associação Naval 1º de Maio.

Regula repeated individual numbers in the 2009–10 campaign, again appearing in 11 league games but managing to score once – in a 3–5 loss at F.C. Paços de Ferreira– as the Sadinos again retained their division status. On 11 November 2010 he suffered a serious injury to his fibula in a match against U.D. Leiria and, on 30 June 2011, as his contract expired, was released by the club.

After becoming a free agent, Regula was set to complete a transfer to Calcio Catania in Italy, with the move even being announced in July 2011. However, the transfer collapsed shortly after, and he signed for S.C. Olhanense the following month.

Regula was loaned to Segunda Liga team Associação Naval 1º de Maio for 2012–13. In February 2015, still owned by Olhanense, he joined PFC Litex Lovech from Bulgaria.

References

External links

1989 births
Living people
Portuguese footballers
Association football midfielders
Primeira Liga players
Liga Portugal 2 players
Segunda Divisão players
Vitória F.C. players
S.C. Olhanense players
Associação Naval 1º de Maio players
Atlético Clube de Portugal players
C.D. Pinhalnovense players
First Professional Football League (Bulgaria) players
PFC Litex Lovech players
Portugal under-21 international footballers
Portuguese expatriate footballers
Expatriate footballers in Bulgaria
Portuguese expatriate sportspeople in Bulgaria
People from Setúbal District
Sportspeople from Setúbal District